Yesh Atid is a centrist, liberal political party in Israel. Founded by Yair Lapid in 2012, it seeks to represent what it considers the centre of Israeli society: the secular middle class. It focuses primarily on civic, socio-economic, and governance issues, including government reform and ending military draft exemptions for the ultra-Orthodox. Yesh Atid has endorsed reentering peace negotiations with the Palestinians and halting further construction in Israeli settlements.

In 2013, the first election it contested in, Yesh Atid placed second, winning 19 seats in the 120-seat Knesset. It then entered into a coalition led by the Likud party. In the 2015 election the party refused to back the Likud; after suffering a significant setback and losing seats it joined the opposition.

On 21 February 2019, Yesh Atid united with the Israel Resilience Party to form a centrist alliance named Blue and White for the upcoming election.  Yesh Atid and Telem left the alliance on 29 March 2020 and formed an independent faction in the Knesset. Yesh Atid ran in the 2021 election alone and won 17 seats, the second-largest party in the Knesset, making up the largest party in Israel's governing coalition at the time, with party leader Yair Lapid serving as Prime Minister in 2022.

After the 2022 election Yesh Atid won 24 seats in the Knesset, a record number as of yet. Due to a worse result by other parties in the coalition, Yesh Atid moved to the opposition with Benjamin Netanyahu becoming prime minister again.

History
In early 2010, speculation arose in the Israeli media concerning the possibility that Israeli journalist and television figure Yair Lapid, who at the time worked as a news anchor at Channel 2, would end his career in journalism and begin a career in Israeli politics. Initially, Lapid dismissed these reports. The Knesset initiated legislation to lessen the influx of Israeli journalists running for a position by prohibiting them as candidates in the first year after they ended their journalism careers.

Despite widespread interest in Lapid, he declined to be interviewed. He gained support through social networks, primarily his Facebook page. Among his official announcements, Lapid said he would not join Kadima or the Israeli Labor Party. In addition, Lapid announced that he would work to change the system of government, have all Israelis conscripted to serve time in the army, and would work to change the Israeli matriculation program. In early January 2012, Lapid officially announced that he would quit journalism in order to enter politics, and that he would lead a new party.

In April 2012, the proposed new party was reported to be named "Atid". Lapid said that the party would not have any members who were legislators or Members of Knesset (MKs). On 29 April, Lapid registered his party as "Yesh Atid", after the name "Atid" was rejected. On 1 May, the first party conference was held, in which Lapid revealed the "Lapid Program" ("תוכנית לפיד"): military service for all Israelis. According to the party's rules, Lapid would determine the candidates who would run for a seat in the Knesset—for he would be the one to make the final decisions on political issues—and was guaranteed the position of chairman of the party during the terms of the 19th and 20th Knessets. The party was capped at raising 13.5 million shekels for the 2013 Israeli legislative election.

Lapid has said his party is different from his late father's Shinui, in part because of its diversity and its inclusion of religious figures. Despite this, analysts have found them somewhat similar.

Yesh Atid presented centrist populism to its middle and upper-middle class constituency, with anti-incumbent messages and calls for cleaner politics, similar to so-called "new/centrist populist parties" that have arisen in Europe. Yesh Atid voters tend to have higher levels of income and education compared to the general population, and hold moderate views on economic and security issues.

On 9 May 2021, it was reported that Lapid and Yamina leader Naftali Bennett had made major headway in the coalition talks. The anti-Netanyahu coalition has been described as the "Change bloc."

After cultivating ties with liberal parties worldwide, Yesh Atid became a Liberal International partner, and in October 2021, was admitted as an observer member.

19th Knesset

In the election held on 22 January 2013, Yesh Atid won the second-largest share of representation in the Knesset, with 19 seats. The party was particularly strong in wealthy districts. Yesh Atid's success was viewed as the largest surprise of the election, as pre-election polling gave the party only 11 seats. He joined Netanyahu's governing coalition. Although he focused mostly on domestic and economic concerns of social justice, he had criticized Netanyahu's foreign policy and said he would not sit in a government that was not serious about pursuing peace.

Lapid endorsed Netanyahu for prime minister after the election, and on 15 March 2013, the party signed a coalition agreement with the ruling Likud party.

Almost one year after the election, a survey was published showing a continuing trend of decreasing popularity of the party, which would only achieve 10 seats in the Knesset, as opposed to the 19 party members who were elected, if elections were held at that time, and with 75% of those polled claiming to be disappointed by Lapid's performance. The finance ministry post came with budgetary restrictions (cutting spending, raising taxes, and confronting the money demands of the defense ministry) that affected Lapid's popularity.

20th Knesset

Run-up to the 2015 election
Before the 2015 election, Lapid separately courted both Tzipi Livni (Hatnuah) and Moshe Kahlon (Kulanu) in an effort to form electoral alliances with their respective parties. Both efforts were unsuccessful: Livni formed an alliance with Labor, and Kahlon preferred to run alone. On 8 February 2015, Yesh Atid MK Shai Piron said the party would prefer a coalition led by Isaac Herzog and Livni than one by Netanyahu.

Lapid's criticism while campaigning was mostly of Netanyahu and his Likud party. His campaign continued to emphasize the economy over national security, although he has somewhat departed from his previous almost-exclusive focus on domestic policy and become more vocal, and left-leaning, on the peace process. The party focused on middle-class needs and in this respect was very similar to Kahlon's new Kulanu party. However, Lapid's main electoral base is the European-oriented upper-middle class, whereas Kahlon targeted the lower-middle class. While both Yesh Atid and Kulanu are positioned as centrist parties, Yesh Atid is almost universally considered to be aligned with the left-leaning political bloc, and Kulanu, sometimes considered right-leaning, is a "swing" party not aligned with any bloc.

Aftermath
Yesh Atid won 11 seats in the 20th Knesset, making it the fourth-largest faction. However, it increased in popularity throughout 2017 and the first months of 2018, rivalling Likud as the biggest party in opinion polls. After the Haredim received favorable draft concessions in a negotiated deal among the government coalition, Yair Lapid denounced the arrangements as an "insult to the IDF" and a "fraud".

Current MKs

Political position
The political position of Yesh Atid is controversial. In general, this party is mainly regarded as a centrist party. Yesh Atid is also evaluated as "centre-right" or "centre-left". This party has both free market and socially liberal tendencies which point the party to mild libertarianism outside the traditional left-right paradigm.

Platform
In the application submitted to the party registrar, Lapid listed the party's eight goals. According to this statement, these include:

Changing the priorities in Israel, with an emphasis on civil lifeeducation, housing, health, transport, and policing, as well as improving the condition of the middle class.
Changing the system of government.
Equality in education and the draftall Israeli school students must be taught essential classes, all Israelis will be drafted into the Army, and all Israeli citizens will be encouraged to seek work, including the ultra-Orthodox sector and the Arab sector.
Fighting political corruption, including corruption in government in the form of institutions like "Minister without portfolio", opting for a government of 18 ministers at most, fortifying the rule of law, and protecting the status of the High Court of Justice.
Growth and economic efficiencycreating growth engines as a way of fighting poverty, combating red tape, removing barriers, improving the transportation system, reducing the cost of living and housing costs, and improving social mobility through assistance to small businesses.
Legislation of Education Law in cooperation with teachers' unions, eliminating most of the matriculation exams, raising the differential education index, and increasing school autonomy.
Enacting a constitution to regulate tense relations between population groups in Israel.
Striving for peace according to an outline of "two states for two peoples", while maintaining the large Israeli settlement blocs and ensuring the safety of Israel.

Other positions

Yesh Atid is also in favor of the following:
Creating greater religious pluralism, diversity, and equality between Jews and all movements of Judaism within Israel by instituting public funding by the state for the non-Orthodox movements within Judaism, such as the Reform, Conservative, Reconstructionist, and Humanistic movements, similar to the public funding of the Orthodox Chief Rabbinate by the state
Allowing non-Orthodox movements to perform religious conversions and weddings, and have their conversions and weddings accepted as legitimate by the state
Allowing egalitarian prayer between men and women, and all Orthodox and non-Orthodox Jewish religious movements, at the Western Wall
Partial operation of public transportation on Saturdays
Renewing peace negotiations with the Palestinians and halting construction in Israeli settlements
Gradually ending Israel's dependency on fossil fuels to become carbon neutral in 2050.

Yesh Atid supports increasing LGBT rights. The party supports the following policies:

 Allowing surrogacy for same-sex couples.
 Instituting civil marriage in Israel, including between same-sex couples.
 Allowing LGBT adoption of Israeli children. Currently, Israeli same-sex couples are allowed to adopt foreign children, but not Israeli ones.
 Introducing more stringent punisment for hate crimes against LGBT individuals.
 Banning conversion therapy.
 Allowing individuals to change their gender in their identity card without having to undergo gender reassignment surgery.
 Releasing guidelines on the treatment of LGBT individuals in the education system and incorporating mandatory LGBT-related studies.

Leaders

Election results

See also
Elections in Israel
Shinui

References

External links
  

2012 establishments in Israel
Anti-clerical parties
Centre-left parties in Asia
Centrist parties in Israel
Liberal parties in Israel
Liberalism in Israel
Political parties established in 2012
Political parties in Israel
Secularism in Israel
Social liberal parties
Zionist political parties in Israel